The Women's 200m Freestyle event at the 10th FINA World Aquatics Championships swam on 22–23 July 2003 in Barcelona, Spain. Preliminary and semifinal heats swam on July 22, while the Final swam on July 23.

Prior to the event, the World (WR) and Championship (CR) records were:
WR: 1:56.64 swum by Franziska van Almsick (Germany) on August 3, 2002 in Berlin, Germany
CR: 1:56.78 swum by Franziska van Almsick (Germany) on September 6, 1994 in Rome, Italy

Results

Final

Semifinals

Preliminaries

References

Swimming at the 2003 World Aquatics Championships
2003 in women's swimming